Windsor International Airport  is located in the southeast portion of the city of Windsor, Ontario, Canada. The airport serves a mixture of scheduled airline flights and general aviation, and is a popular point of entry into Canada for private and business aircraft. The airspace above the airport is exceptionally busy because of the proximity to Detroit Metropolitan Airport, and Instrument Flight Rules (IFR) arrivals and departures are handled by Detroit approach control.

The airport is classified as an airport of entry by Nav Canada and is staffed by the Canada Border Services Agency (CBSA). CBSA officers at this airport can handle aircraft up to 325 passengers, and can handle up to 450 if the aircraft is unloaded in stages.

History

In 1967, the airport was added to the national portfolio of Canadian airports, citing its increasing importance as a regional airport hub for Southwestern Ontario, serving the areas between Detroit, Michigan, and London, Ontario, and well expanding beyond its original roots as a mere landing strip.

Recent history

In 2006, Serco Aviation Services, Inc., announced that they would request early termination of their airport management contract with the City of Windsor, as Windsor Airport had been losing around CAD$40,000 per month. The City of Windsor accepted Serco's withdrawal and prepared to operate the airport itself, but with a large deficit. On July 1, 2007, Serco handed over operations of the airport to the City of Windsor. Windsor City Council had approved of an ad hoc group to run the airport on behalf of the city, named "Your Quick Gateway (Windsor) Inc." (after the airport's ICAO call letters, YQG). This private organization was formed by the Windsor City Council, and was supposed to be a "temporary band-aid solution" until another operator was found. However, on November 14, The Windsor Star reported that since Your Quick Gateway had been so successful in managing the airport, posting a small profit in the process, it would be given permission to operate the facility indefinitely in this manner.

The airport has additional land bounded by farm land along Division Road and Lauzon Parkway for future airport expansion.

In 2012, The Windsor Star reported that airport traffic had increased over 160% since 2008, with over 250,000 passengers passing through the airport in 2012, its busiest year ever. This has widely been attributed to aggressive efforts to attract more flights to existing destinations, and to new destinations. In 2011, Porter Airlines began flying from Windsor to Toronto (Billy Bishop Toronto City Airport) and Porter declared that Windsor is one of its most successful new markets. However, 37% of the local market still uses Detroit Metro Airport as its airport of choice.

In early October 2013, the City of Windsor announced it would invest $14.1 million into the airport to create a multi-modal cargo terminal. The project is expected to create approximately 105 jobs for the City of Windsor and has the potential to create thousands of jobs. The first tenant for the new cargo hub at Windsor Airport would be FedEx which signed a 20-year lease to run the hub and it was moved into the facility by December 1, 2015. In 2016 the airport handled 331,000 passengers.

In June 2020, Air Canada ended its Windsor to Montreal service due to the financial impact of the COVID-19 pandemic in Canada.

Airlines and destinations

Passenger

Cargo

Tenants

364 Royal Canadian Air Cadets
 Windsor Flying Club
 Canadian Historical Aircraft Association
 Journey Air/ Great Lakes Flight Centre
 Georgian Express
 Skyservice fixed-base operator (FBO)
AAR Corp. - airframe maintenance (MRO)

Technical information

General
 Latitude/Longitude: 42° 16' 32" N, 82° 57' 20" W
 Elevation: 
 Magnetic variation: 7° W

The airport is operated by Your Quick Gateway on behalf of the City of Windsor, is certified by Transport Canada, and operates as an airport of entry with Canadian customs services available. There is a landing fee for some aircraft.

Runways
 Runway 07/25: , asphalt, lighted, PAPI type 2 approach lighting for both ends
 Runway 12/30: , asphalt, lighted, PAPI type 2 approach lighting for both ends

Communications
 Remote Communications Outlet (RCO): London Radio, 123.375 MHz
 Automatic Terminal Information Service (ATIS): 134.5 MHz
 Ground control: 121.7 MHz
 Tower: 124.7 MHz (mandatory frequency when tower is closed)
 IFR arrivals and departures: Detroit Approach Control, 124.9 MHz
 Visual Flight Rules (VFR) advisories: Windsor-area Detroit Approach Control, 126.85 MHz

Navigation aids
 Non-directional beacons (NDB): Windsor (QG), 353 kHz, 250°  to airport; Laurel (ZQG), 398 kHz, 70°  to airport
 Instrument landing system (ILS): runway 25 (IQG)

Fixed-base operator (FBO)
Parking is available from the airport operator; there is a charge for parking longer than six hours.
 Great Lakes Flight Centre (Esso Avitat): 122.95 MHz—100LL avgas and Jet-A fuel

Fire and rescue

Category 6 ARFF coverage is provided by airport employees. Two E-One ARFF crash vehicles are stationed at the airport firehall. Essex-Windsor EMS provides medical assistance at the airport.

Statistics

References

External links

 Official website
 Journey Air Pilot Training
 Windsor Flying Club - flight training
 Live Airport Radar

 Southwestern Ontario Digital Archive: Airport, Windsor, Ontario, Canada

Transport in Windsor, Ontario
Certified airports in Essex County, Ontario